Livin' the Life is an album by Chris and Lorin Rowan, recorded in 1972, containing unreleased studio recordings.

Track listing
 "Livin' the Life"  (Chris Rowan)
 "Climbing Up The Mountain" (Lorin Rowan)
 "Waiting in the Garden" (Chris & Lorin Rowan)
 "Outside, Clover and Cheese" (Lorin Rowan)
 "Peace and Happiness (Jungle Queen)" (Chris Rowan)
 "Guardian Angel (They Were There)" (Lorin Rowan)
 "Heavens to Betsy" (Chris Rowan)
 "Feel the Spirit" (Lorin Rowan)
 "Free" (Chris & Lorin Rowan)
 "Run to the Wind" (Chris & Lorin Rowan)
 "Don't You Worry" (Chris Rowan)

Personnel
Chris Rowan - guitar, piano, vocals
Lorin Rowan - guitar, piano, vocals
Billy Wolf - bass
Bill Kreutzmann - drums
David Grisman - mandolin, piano, organ
Gregg Dewey - drums
Ed Bogus - strings
Jerry Garcia - pedal steel guitar
Bill Elliott - piano

References

1980 albums
The Rowans albums